PointTracker, created by IBM, is an application featured in Grand Slam tennis tournaments that presents an animated 3D view of each shot played in a singles match.

A menu to the right of the application displays all points played and allows users to select a point to view from each set. Points may also be grouped according to forehand winners, backhand winners, forehand unforced errors, backhand unforced errors, aces and challenged points.

Viewing angles
Each point can be viewed from a number of preset angles.
Default: 
Overhead: 
Umpire:
Net:
From the view of the players:

As well as these fixed angles, the viewing angle can be freely rotated by the user.

Serve, Return and Winner speed
For each point, the service speed, return of service speed and the winner speed are displayed, if applicable, as a particular point progresses.

Preferences
A number of preferences can be set by the user.
Visible Shots: The number of shots visible at one time in a certain point can be set to either 1, 2, 3 or all.
Speed Display: The speed display can be set in mph or km/h.
Track Display: The line of the ball in a point can be displayed as a solid line or a ball. If a line is chosen, then a green line (Wimbledon and Roland-Garros)/orange line (Australian Open) (showing the path of the ball hit by one player) and a yellow line (showing the path of the ball hit by the other player) is displayed. The number of lines displayed at one time is dependent on the setting chosen in visible shots. If a ball is chosen, then the path of the ball is shown by a yellow tennis ball and the setting chosen in visible shots is not applicable.

Sports television technology
Tennis equipment